Cedar County may refer to:

 Cedar County, Iowa 
 Cedar County, Missouri 
 Cedar County, Nebraska
 Cedar County, Choctaw Nation
 Cedar County, Washington, a proposed county made up of part of King County
 Cedar County, Utah Territory, a former county

See also 
 Cedar (disambiguation)